Euchaetes rizoma is a moth of the family Erebidae. It was described by William Schaus in 1896. It is found in Brazil.

References

 Arctiidae genus list at Butterflies and Moths of the World of the Natural History Museum

Phaegopterina
Moths described in 1896